Lake Rotoroa or Hamilton Lake (officially Lake Rotoroa / Hamilton Lake) is a lake in Hamilton, Waikato, North Island, New Zealand.
It is the home of the Hamilton Yacht Club, which holds regular sailing in the summer.

Lake Rotoroa formed, like most of the lakes in the central Waikato (Hamilton) basin, about 20,000 years ago, after the Waikato changed course to flow out at Port Waikato, rather than at Thames. It was a high-energy, braided river carrying large volumes of volcanogenic sediment (Hinuera Formation), which was deposited over and around a pre-existing hilly landscape to form an alluvial plain. In the process of depositing the alluvium, small basins were formed adjacent to the hills, and water then accumulated from local drainage and groundwater in these small basins. At Rotoroa, initially two small shallow lakes were formed with clear water in an embayment of the partially enclosing hills, a low spur off the hills separating them. Peat growth in the adjacent Rukuhia bog to the west and south then expanded and deepened as net precipitation increased as climate became warmer and wetter in the region, lifting regional water tables. The peat then encroached on to the alluvial dam holding in the two shallow lakes, forming a second storey barrier on top so that the two lakes coalesced into a single deeper lake with brownish peat-stained water, submerging the low spur.

It was named after the Innes family from 1956.

Near the cafe, a shelter covers the old locomotive, F230, donated in 1957.

On Ruakiwi Rd an ivy-covered memorial arch to Arthur Swarbrick, former chairman of the Hamilton Domain Board, dates from 1929.

The lake is sometimes affected by cyanobacteria, due to its high nutrient levels. However, the eutrophic quality of the lake has improved since 1998 due to regrowth of macrophytes, such as charophytes.

In 1959,  of sodium arsenate was poured in the lake to control weeds. Arsenic is still in the sediment and eating fish from the lake is not recommended; it is on Regional Council's contaminated sites list. Copper, lead, mercury and zinc also exceed the Australian and New Zealand Environment and Conservation Council (ANZECC) guideline value in parts of the lake.

On 26 August 2021, the official dual name of the lake was standardised as Lake Rotoroa / Hamilton Lake, having previously been Lake Rotoroa (Hamilton Lake) since 1974.

Sports 
Lake Rotoroa is a venue for many sports.

At Innes Common, a park on the east side of the lake is the Waikato Hockey Association Sports Ground.

Innes Common also provides the best access to the lake for watersports. Small sailing boats and canoes are frequently seen on the lake. The lake is too small for rowing skiffs because as soon as they get up to top speed they have to stop. The lake is better suited to slower boats that can turn easily.

The  scenic path around the lake makes it a suitable venue for walking and running. The Hamilton Road Runners Club is based at the Hamilton Yacht Club and meets there for runs every Thursday evening and Saturday morning, as well as hosting a running event at the lake each year in summer. There are water fountains at the playground at the north-west side of the lake and also at Innes Common.

There are also short bush walks and a small golf green on the west side of the lake.

References

Green, J.D. and Lowe, D.J. 1994. Origins and development. In: Clayton, J.S.; de Winton, M.D. (eds) “Lake Rotoroa: Change in an Urban Lake”. National Institute of Water & Atmospheric Research Ecosystems Publication 9, 13–23.
Hewitt, A.E., Balks, M.R., and Lowe, D.J. 2021. Chapter 8: Organic Soils. In: "The Soils of Aotearoa New Zealand" (1st ed). Springer, Cham, pp. 113–132.
Lowe, D.J. 2014. How the lake [Lake Rotoroa] was formed: influence of the ancestral Waikato River. In: Taylor, J. “Hamilton Lake – City Playground”. Published by Jeff Taylor, Hamilton, pp. 6–13.
Lowe, D.J. 2021. Introduction to the landscapes and soils of the Hamilton Basin and South Waikato: Field notes. School of Science, University of Waikato, Hamilton. 36 pp. DOI: 10.13140/RG.2.2.36071.39845 
Lowe, D.J. and Green, J.D. 1992. Lakes. In: Soons, J.M., Selby, M.J. (eds) Landforms of New Zealand, 2nd edition. Longman Paul, Auckland, pp. 107–143.
McCraw, J.D. 2011. The Wandering River. Landforms and geological history of the Hamilton Basin. GSNZ Guidebook 16. Geosciences Society of New Zealand. 88pp.

External links

Hamilton Kete - timeline of reserve history from 1800
86 photos of lake

Geography of Hamilton, New Zealand
Lakes of Waikato